Deoraj Singh Patel (born 30 December 1968 Village Sumedha, Rewa district) is an Indian politician, belonging to Bahujan Samaj Party. In the 2009 election he was elected to the 15th Lok Sabha from the Rewa Lok Sabha constituency of Madhya Pradesh.

He is an agriculturist and social worker. He resides at Rewa district.

He is married to Nisha Singh and has one daughter and two sons.

References

External links
 Fifteenth Lok Sabha Members Bioprofile in Lok Sahba website

India MPs 2009–2014
1968 births
Living people
People from Madhya Pradesh
People from Rewa district
Bahujan Samaj Party politicians from Madhya Pradesh
Lok Sabha members from Madhya Pradesh
Bahujan Samaj Party candidates in the 2014 Indian general election